The 1989–90 Virginia Cavaliers men's basketball team represented University of Virginia as a member of the Atlantic Coast Conference during the 1989–90 NCAA Division I men's basketball season. The team was led by 16th-year head coach Terry Holland, coaching in his final year at the school. The Cavaliers earned an at-large bid to the NCAA tournament as #7 seed in the Southeast region. They defeated Notre Dame in the opening round before falling to Syracuse in the second round. The Cavaliers finished with a record of 20–12 (6–8 ACC).

Roster

Schedule and results

|-
!colspan=9 style="background:#00214e; color:#f56d22;"| Regular season

|-
!colspan=9 style="background:#00214e; color:#f56d22;"| ACC Tournament

|-
!colspan=9 style="background:#00214e; color:#f56d22;"| NCAA tournament

Rankings

References

Virginia Cavaliers men's basketball seasons
Virginia
Virginia
Virgin
Virgin